Iner or INER may refer to:
 Institute of Nuclear Energy Research, or INER
 Iner Souster, musician
 Iner Sontany Putra, footballer